U4atac minor spliceosomal RNA  is a ncRNA which is an essential component of the minor U12-type spliceosome complex. The U12-type spliceosome is required for removal of the rarer class of eukaryotic introns (AT-AC, U12-type).

U4atac snRNA is proposed to form a base-paired complex with another spliceosomal RNA U6atac via two stem loop regions. These interacting stem loops have been shown to be required for in vivo splicing. U4atac also contains a 3' Sm protein binding site which has been shown to be essential for splicing activity. U4atac is the functional analog of U4 spliceosomal RNA in the major U2-type spliceosomal complex.

The Drosophila U4atac snRNA has an additional predicted 3' stem loop terminal to the Sm binding site.

Disease
It has been shown that mutations in the U4atac snRNA can cause microcephalic osteodysplastic primordial dwarfism type I (MOPD I), also called Taybi-Linder syndrome (TALS). MOPD I is a developmental disorder that is associated with brain and skeletal abnormalities. It has been shown that the mutations cause defective U12 splicing.

References

External links
 

Non-coding RNA
Spliceosome
RNA splicing